Pierre Serge Boisvert (born June 1, 1959) is a Canadian former professional ice hockey player for the Toronto Maple Leafs and Montreal Canadiens.

In Sweden, Boisvert played for Västra Frölunda, and for Frisk Tigers, Spektrum Flyers and Vålerenga in Norway. He won the Calder Cup in 1985. He won a Stanley Cup championship in 1986 with Montreal. In 2002 Boisvert coached Frisk Tigers to the Norwegian Championship.

Post career
Since 2010, Boisvert has been an amateur scout with the Montreal Canadiens of the NHL.

Career statistics

Regular season and playoffs

International

References

External links

1959 births
Living people
Canadian ice hockey centres
Canadian ice hockey coaches
Canadian expatriate ice hockey players in Norway
Canadian expatriate ice hockey players in Switzerland
Canadian expatriate ice hockey players in Sweden
French Quebecers
Frisk Asker Ishockey coaches
Frisk Asker Ishockey players
Frölunda HC players
HC Davos players
Ice hockey people from Quebec
Ice hockey players at the 1988 Winter Olympics
Japan Ice Hockey League players
Moncton Alpines (AHL) players
Montreal Canadiens players
Montreal Canadiens scouts
New Brunswick Hawks players
Olympic ice hockey players of Canada
Sportspeople from Drummondville
Sherbrooke Canadiens players
Sherbrooke Castors players
Spektrum Flyers players
St. Catharines Saints players
Stanley Cup champions
Toronto Maple Leafs players
Undrafted National Hockey League players
Vålerenga Ishockey players